The Chinese Ambassador to Oman is the official representative of the People's Republic of China to the Sultanate of Oman.

List of representatives

|-
|
|Li Lingbing
|
|
|Li Keqiang
|Qaboos bin Said al Said
|
|}

References 

 
Oman
China